Mihai N. Săulescu (October 16, 1861 – December 5, 1929) was a Romanian jurist and politician.

Life 
Born in Craiova, he studied economics and finance at Berlin University and obtained a doctorate in law from the University of Paris. He subsequently taught law at the University of Bucharest. A member of the Conservative Party, Săulescu served in the Assembly of Deputies, rising to become vice president of that body. He was a general secretary within the Finance Ministry and, from March to October 1918, served as Finance Minister in the cabinet of Alexandru Marghiloman. The owner of a large library and a rich collection of documents, he sheltered these in Russia during World War I. In late 1922, he entered the People's Party.

Notes

1861 births
1929 deaths
People from Craiova
Humboldt University of Berlin alumni
Academic staff of the University of Bucharest
Members of the Chamber of Deputies (Romania)
Romanian Ministers of Finance
Conservative Party (Romania, 1880–1918) politicians
People's Party (interwar Romania) politicians
Romanian jurists
Romanian economists